Del Monte Market is an historic market located on the western edge of South Phoenix, Arizona. It is listed on the Phoenix Historic Registry as "the oldest continually operating general market in the state."

References

Retail markets in the United States
Retail buildings in Arizona